Tomáš Kalan (born 10 July 1973) is a retired Czech football midfielder.

References

1973 births
Living people
Czech footballers
FK Hvězda Cheb players
SK Slavia Prague players
Dukla Prague footballers
AFK Atlantic Lázně Bohdaneč players
SK Spolana Neratovice players
Czechoslovak First League players
Czech First League players
Association football midfielders